The Piece Maker is the debut album by Tony Touch, released on April 18, 2000, on Tommy Boy Entertainment and Warner Bros. Records.

Background
Tony Touch had already made a name for himself as one of New York City's most prominent mixtape DJs, releasing hundreds of mixtapes since the early 1990s. By 2000, Tony Touch signed a deal with Tommy Boy to release his first album to not only include his DJ work and some production, but his own rhymes as well. In addition to himself, the album featured production from the likes of Gang Starr's DJ Premier, Cypress Hill's DJ Muggs, and the Alchemist, among several others. The album also included several guest artists on it including Gang Starr, Cypress Hill, and Wu-Tang Clan. In addition, two singles were released from the album "I Wonder Why? (He's the Greatest DJ)" and "The Return of the Diaz Bros.", both of which found minor chart success on the Billboard R&B charts. The Piece Maker proved popular enough that Tony Touch released a sequel in 2004 titled The Piece Maker 2.

Reception

Michael Gallucci of AllMusic gave the album 2.5 out of a possible five stars, proclaiming "DJ Touch has assembled an impressive list of guests", while also stating the album was "marred by homophobic proclamations and played-out clichés". Steve "Flash" Juon of RapReviews gave the album a much more favorable review. He gave the album a 9 out 10 and in his review he stated "Tony Touch keeps his mic time both minimal and unannoying and gives a VERY solid selection of hip-hop's best artists time to shine on fat new joints. If this was ANY movie's soundtrack, it would easily outgross the film. High marks to Touch for reviving a field which lesser contemporaries like DJ Clue nearly killed with boring CDs."

The album was mildly successful commercially. It spent 9 weeks on the Billboard 200, peaking at No. 57, but it achieved greater success on the Top R&B/Hip-Hop Albums, spending 44 weeks on the chart and peaking at No. 19. As of June 2005, the album has sold over 250,000 copies.

Track listing

Charts

References

2000 debut albums
Albums produced by the Alchemist (musician)
Albums produced by the Beatnuts
Albums produced by DJ Muggs
Albums produced by DJ Premier
Albums produced by DJ Scratch
Albums produced by Agallah
Tommy Boy Records albums
Warner Records albums